The Hive, also known as Learning Hub South, is a building located in Nanyang Technological University, Singapore. The S$45 million building was designed by Thomas Heatherwick and completed in 2015. Colloquially, the building is known as the "dim sum basket building" due to its likeness to the steamer baskets used to contain dim sum.

The Hive was a finalist for the 2015 World Architecture Festival Commercial Mixed-Use Award in the Future Projects subcategory.

Architecture
Designed by British designer Thomas Heatherwick, The Hive is Heatherwick Studio's first major building in Asia. The building consists of 12 eight-storey towers arranged around a public atrium. The towers taper towards the base and house 56 corner-less classrooms. The concrete stair and lift cores between the towers are embedded with 700 drawings from British artist Sara Fanelli that depict images from science, art and literature.

The building has received mixed reviews, with the Architectural Review saying that while "there is much to admire" about the building, "it gave off something of a forlorn car-park aesthetic".

References

External links

Nanyang Technological University
Buildings and structures completed in 2015
2015 establishments in Singapore
Buildings and structures in Singapore